The King Car Group is a Taiwanese conglomerate which owns a number of international brands such as the Kavalan Distillery and Mr. Brown Coffee.

Name
The name King Car is a rough translation of the Chinese "to drive wealth."

History
The King Car Group was founded in 1979 by Lee Tien-Tsai and at first sold root beer. Root beer was not lucrative and in 1982 King Car pivoted to canned coffee, setting up the Mr. Browns brand on the advice of a Japanese mentor of Lee. By the mid 1990s the Mr. Brown brand was dominant domestically and was expanding internationally. In 1995 King Car tried to enter the alcohol market for the first time but their plans were rejected by the government which at the time held a monopoly on alcohol production. Following the de-monopolization of the alcohol market in 2002 King Car began work on its first distillery, Kavalan, which opened in 2005.

Subsidiaries

Buckskin
Buckskin is a major Taiwanese beer brand based in Taoyuan. It was launched by King Car in 2018 to compete with Taiwan Beer.

Some 7-Elevens in Taiwan feature Buckskin beer on tap.

Chu Chen Company
Founded in 1956. Produces household and personal hygiene products.

Kavalan

The Kavalan Distillery is the largest whisky producer in Taiwan and one of the best in the world having won the World Whiskies Awards’ single malt category.

Mr. Brown

Mr. Brown Coffee operates retail coffee shops and sells a series of canned coffee products.

See also
 Beer in Taiwan
 List of companies of Taiwan
 Taiwanese whisky
 I-Mei Foods
 Want Want

References

King Car Group
Taiwanese brands
Agriculture companies of Taiwan